Nikopol Point (Nos Nikopol \'nos ni-'ko-pol\) is an ice-free point on the south coast of Byers Peninsula, Livingston Island in the South Shetland Islands, Antarctica projecting 650 m east-southeastwards into Bransfield Strait and linked by a spit to Vietor Rock to the south. The area was visited by early 19th century sealers who had dwellings at the foothills of nearby Sealer Hill.

The feature is named after the town of Nikopol, Bulgaria.

The Spanish facility Camp Byers, situated near Nikopol Point, operated in 2001/02 and subsequent seasons.

Location 
The point is located at the west end of South Beaches, Byers Peninsula, 4.57 km east of Devils Point, 1.22 km east-southeast of Sealer Hill and 4.21 km west-southwest of Dometa Point.

Maps
 Península Byers, Isla Livingston. Mapa topográfico a escala 1:25000. Madrid: Servicio Geográfico del Ejército, 1992.
 L.L. Ivanov et al. Antarctica: Livingston Island and Greenwich Island, South Shetland Islands. Scale 1:100000 topographic map. Sofia: Antarctic Place-names Commission of Bulgaria, 2005.
 L.L. Ivanov. Antarctica: Livingston Island and Greenwich, Robert, Snow and Smith Islands. Scale 1:120000 topographic map.  Troyan: Manfred Wörner Foundation, 2009.  
 Antarctic Digital Database (ADD). Scale 1:250000 topographic map of Antarctica. Scientific Committee on Antarctic Research (SCAR). Since 1993, regularly upgraded and updated.
 L.L. Ivanov. Antarctica: Livingston Island and Smith Island. Scale 1:100000 topographic map. Manfred Wörner Foundation, 2017.

Notes

References
 Nikopol Point. SCAR Composite Gazetteer of Antarctica.
 Bulgarian Antarctic Gazetteer. Antarctic Place-names Commission. (details in Bulgarian, basic data in English)

External links
 Nikopol Point. Copernix satellite image

Headlands of Livingston Island